Macatuba is a municipality in the state of São Paulo in Brazil. The population is 17,214 (2020 est.) in an area of 225 km². The elevation is 515 m.

References

Municipalities in São Paulo (state)